Cydney Clanton (born July 18, 1989) is an American professional golfer who has played on the LPGA Tour and the Symetra Tour. She has won twice on the Symetra Tour and once on the LPGA Tour.

Amateur career
Clanton played college golf at Auburn University where she won twice. She also won the North and South Women's Amateur. She played on the winning 2010 Curtis Cup team where she won two matches and halved a third. She also played on the U.S. team at the 2010 Espirito Santo Trophy that finished second to the South Korea team.

Professional career
Clanton turned professional in 2011 and played on the Symetra Tour that year. She earned her LPGA Tour card for 2012 through the LPGA Final Qualifying Tournament. She has played on both tours since: winning the 2013 Four Winds Invitational and 2019 Murphy USA El Dorado Shootout on the Symetra Tour and the 2019 Dow Great Lakes Bay Invitational on the LPGA Tour. The Dow tournament was a team event where she partnered with Jasmine Suwannapura.

Amateur wins
this list may be incomplete
2010 North and South Women's Amateur

Professional wins

LPGA Tour wins (1)

Symetra Tour wins (2)
2013 Four Winds Invitational
2019 Murphy USA El Dorado Shootout

Results in LPGA majors
Results not in chronological order before 2018.

^ The Evian Championship was added as a major in 2013

CUT = missed the half-way cut
NT = no tournament
T = tied

U.S. national team appearances
Espirito Santo Trophy: 2010
Curtis Cup: 2010 (winners)

References

External links

American female golfers
Auburn Tigers women's golfers
LPGA Tour golfers
Golfers from North Carolina
Sportspeople from Winston-Salem, North Carolina
People from Rowan County, North Carolina
1989 births
Living people